The 2016–17 Danish Superliga season was the 27th season of the Danish Superliga, which decides the Danish football championship. The season was the first with a new league structure in which 14 clubs play each other home and away, until the league was split up in championship and relegation play-offs. The new structure was inspired by the one used by the Belgian First Division A and was approved by the Danish FA, Dansk Boldspil-Union, on 28 June 2015.

The fixtures were announced on 6 June 2016.

Teams
Hobro IK finished the 2015–16 season in 12th place and was relegated to the 2016–17 1st Division.

The relegated team was replaced by 2015–16 1st Division champions Lyngby Boldklub, while the 2nd and 3rd place teams,  Silkeborg IF and AC Horsens, were promoted to bring the total teams in the league to 14.

On 23 October 2016, the home stadium for Odense Boldklub changed its name from TRE-FOR Park to EWII Park as a consequence of the current stadium sponsor changing its name.

On 31 December 2016, the previous sponsorship agreement for the home stadium of Aalborg BK, Nordjyske Arena, expired and the stadium was officially referred to as Aalborg Stadium, because a new sponsorship agreement was signed and took effect on 1 April 2017, renaming the stadium Aalborg Portland Park.

Stadia and locations

Personnel and sponsoring
Note: Flags indicate national team as has been defined under FIFA eligibility rules. Players and Managers may hold more than one non-FIFA nationality.

Managerial changes

Regular season

Positions by round

Results

Championship round
Points and goals carried over in full from regular season. The round began 2 April 2017.

Positions by round
Below the positions per round are shown. As teams did not all start with an equal number of points, the initial pre-playoffs positions are also given.

Relegation round
Points and goals carried over in full from regular season. The round began 2 April 2017.

Group A

Group B

European play-offs

Bracket

European play-off quarter-finals

European play-off semi-finals

European play-off final

Relegation play-offs

First round

Second round

Third round

Top goalscorers

Awards

Player of the Month

Attendances
Teams with an average home attendance of at least 10,000:

References

External links

Superliga (uefa.com)

Danish Superliga seasons
1
Denmark
2016–17 in Danish football leagues